John Head (c. 1656–1711) was an English politician from Hampstead Norreys in Berkshire who sat in the House of Commons of England from 1685 to 1689.

Whithed was elected in 1685 as a Member of Parliament for the borough of Stockbridge in Hampshire, where his family owned property including the manor of Lickpit. He does not appear to have ever stood for election again.

His family had risen from the yeomanry to gentry, and his descendants continued to rise in status. Walter James Head changed his surname to James in 1778, was created a baronet in 1791, and in 1884 his grandson Walter James was elevated to the peerage as Baron Northbourne.

References 

1656 births
Year of birth uncertain
1711 deaths
English MPs 1685–1687
People from West Berkshire District